Arregui is a surname. Notable people with the surname include:

Adrián Arregui (born 1992), Argentine footballer
Antonio Arregui Yarza (born 1939), Catholic Archbishop Emeritus of Guayaquil Ecuador
Carolina Arregui (born 1965), Chilean television actress
Celinda Arregui (1864-1941), Chilean feminist politician, writer, teacher, suffrage activist 
Felipe Arregui (born 1994), Argentine player
Ignacio Eizaguirre Arregui (1920–2013), Spanish footballer
Juan de Arregui (1656–1736), Spanish Franciscan priest and  Roman Catholic Bishop of Buenos Aires
Ricardo Arregui (born 1952), Spanish surgeon, frostbite specialist and former president of CAI Balonmano Aragón and Asobal Handball League